Largny-sur-Automne is a commune in the Aisne department in Hauts-de-France in northern France.

Population

Places of interest

The garden of Les Charmettes, dedicated to the philosopher Jean-Jacques Rousseau, was created by Auguste Castellant from 1891. The garden and the buildings and statues in it have been a listed monument since 2008.

The village church was built in the 12th and 13th centuries.

References

Communes of Aisne
Aisne communes articles needing translation from French Wikipedia